Villegenon is a commune in the Cher department in the Centre-Val de Loire region of France.

Geography
The commune is bounded by the banks of the small Ionne river to the north and the Sauldre to the east.

Population

Sights
 The church of St. Georges.
 The fifteenth-century chateau.

See also
Communes of the Cher department

References

Communes of Cher (department)